Konstandinos Erik "Kosta" Scurfield was a former British Royal Marine who, in December 2014, left for Syria and joined the Kurdish YPG, a militia fighting against the Islamic State. Scurfield, who was known by the Kurdish nom de guerre Sehid Kemal, was killed on 2 March 2015, at the age of 25. He was the first British citizen to be killed in the conflict.

References

People killed by the Islamic State of Iraq and the Levant
21st-century Royal Marines personnel
People from Barnsley
2015 deaths